Charlotte Jean Scott Atkins (born 24 September 1950) is a British Labour Party politician who was the Member of Parliament (MP) for Staffordshire Moorlands from 1997 until 2010.

Early life
Atkins is the daughter of Ron Atkins, the left wing former Labour MP for Preston North, and the longest-lived British MP ever. Atkins was educated at the Colchester County High School, and is a graduate of the London School of Economics, gaining a BSc in Economics. From the University of London, she also gained an MA in Area Studies. She worked as a community relations officer with the Luton Community Research Council from 1974 to 1976, before joining the trade union movement.

For four years she was a researcher with the UCATT union (from 1976 to 1980), then a researcher from 1980 to 1984 for the TASS and AUEW, before becoming a press officer for UNISON and COHSE from 1984 to 1987.

Atkins joined the Labour Party in 1965. In 1982, she was elected as a councillor in the London Borough of Wandsworth, and was the Deputy Leader of the Labour Group from 1983 to 1986. In 1981 she wrote a book with Chris Mullin entitled How to Select or Reselect Your MP.

Parliamentary career
In 1990, Atkins unsuccessfully contested the Eastbourne by-election caused by the assassination of the Conservative MP Ian Gow by the Provisional IRA. She entered the House of Commons at the 1997 general election in the Labour landslide as the Member of Parliament for Staffordshire Moorlands, a seat held previously by the retiring David Knox and which had been Conservative-held for 27 years.

After the 2001 general election, Atkins was appointed a Parliamentary Private Secretary to the Foreign and Commonwealth Office. She was promoted to Parliamentary Under Secretary of State at the Department for Transport in 2004, but was dropped after the 2005 general election. In July 2005 she became a member of the Health Select Committee.

Atkins was largely loyal to the Labour government during her time in Parliament and rarely rebelled.

Atkins was vice-chair of the All-Party Hill Farmers Group, and took part in a series of adjournment debates on government funding for inland waterways. She is a volunteer for the Manchester-based British Fluoridisation Society.

Atkins lost her seat at the 2010 general election to Karen Bradley of the Conservative Party.

In March 2012, Atkins was appointed as the chair of the Central Shires Canal and River Trust Partnership Board. The CRT is the charity which has taken over the work and role of British Waterways. She was heavily involved in campaigning for more funds and the regeneration of England's waterways while in Parliament, and won the first ever Inland Waterways Association Parliamentarian of the Year Award in 2008.

Personal life
She married Gus Brain in June 1990 in Bromley and has one daughter, Emma, born in October 1986.

Her twin sister, Liz, is a Lambeth Councillor.

Publications
 How to Select or Reselect Your Member of Parliament by Chris Mullin and Charlotte Atkins, 1981, Institute of Workers' Control

References

External links
 Guardian Unlimited Politics – Ask Aristotle: Charlotte Atkins MP
 TheyWorkForYou.com – Charlotte Atkins MP
 Official Website
 IWA Parliamentarian of the Year
 BBC Politics

News items
 Claiming Labour wanted to ditch the council tax in 2005
 Opening the Rearsby bypass in December 2004

Labour Party (UK) MPs for English constituencies
UK MPs 1997–2001
UK MPs 2001–2005
UK MPs 2005–2010
Councillors in the London Borough of Wandsworth
Alumni of the London School of Economics
1950 births
Living people
People from Chelmsford
Female members of the Parliament of the United Kingdom for English constituencies
People educated at Colchester County High School
20th-century British women politicians
21st-century British women politicians
20th-century English women
20th-century English people
21st-century English women
21st-century English people
Women councillors in England